The World Golf Hall of Fame is located at World Golf Village near St. Augustine, Florida, in the United States, and it is unusual among sports halls of fame in that a single site honors both men and women. It is supported by a consortium of 26 golf organizations from all over the world.

The Hall of Fame Museum Building was designed by the specialist museum architecture firm E. Verner Johnson and Associates of Boston.  They also produced the museum master plan that established the size, mission and qualities of the museum and the surrounding facilities and site.

The Hall of Fame Museum features a permanent exhibition and a rolling program of temporary exhibitions. Designed by museum design firm Ralph Appelbaum Associates, the Hall of Fame and exhibition area contains exhibits on the game's history, heritage, and techniques; major players and organizations; golf course design, equipment, and dress.

History
The World Golf Hall of Fame was originally located in Pinehurst, North Carolina, and was privately operated by Diamondhead Corp., then owners of the Pinehurst Resort. It opened in September 1974 with an initial class of 13 members. Initially it was a local project, but the PGA of America took over management in 1983 and acquired full ownership in 1986.

Two other halls of fame have been merged into the World Golf Hall of Fame. The PGA of America established one in 1940, which was merged into the Pinehurst Hall in the 1980s. The Hall of Fame of Women's Golf was established by the LPGA in 1951, with four charter members:  Patty Berg, Betty Jameson, Louise Suggs, and Babe Zaharias. It was inactive for some years, but in 1967 it moved into its first physical premises, which were in Augusta, Georgia and was renamed the LPGA Tour Hall of Fame. In 1998 it merged into the World Golf Hall of Fame.

In 1994 the global golf industry established a non-profit making body called the World Golf Foundation to promote the sport, with the creation of an enhanced Hall of Fame as one of its main objectives. Construction at the new site in St. Johns County, Florida began in 1996 and the new facility opened on May 19, 1998.

Membership categories

In October 2013, the Hall announced that it was reviewing its selection process and that there would be no induction ceremony in 2014. A new process was announced in March 2014.

Starting in 2014, members were inducted into the Hall of Fame in one of four categories: Male Competitor, Female Competitor, Veterans, and Lifetime Achievement categories. Elections are held every other year with induction ceremonies in odd number years beginning in 2015. The process has changed from that used from 1996 to 2013. The minimum qualifications for male and female competitors are: minimum of 40 years old, or five years removed from "active competition" and 15 or more wins on "approved tours" or two "major wins". The veterans category is primarily for those golfers whose careers ended before 1980 and includes both amateurs and professionals. The lifetime achievement category remains from the old system.

The Hall again revised the criteria in 2020 and now recognize two categories: Competitor and Contributor. 

A 20-member selection sub-committee will choose from among the eligible candidates and select ballots for a selection committee. There will be five names each on the male and female ballots and three names each on the veterans and lifetime achievement ballots. A separate 16-member selection committee will then vote on all four ballots. Election to the Hall of Fame will require 75% of the vote and each year's election class is limited to two from each ballot and five total.

In 2016, the Hall announced that the age requirement would be raised to 50 from 40 years old. In 2020, the age went from 50 to 45.

Qualification details

Male
Approved tours (15 wins total)
PGA Tour
European Tour
Japan Golf Tour
Sunshine Tour
Asian Tour
PGA Tour of Australasia
Majors or Players Championship (two wins)
Masters Tournament
U.S. Open
The Open Championship
PGA Championship
The Players Championship

Female
Approved tours (15 wins total)
LPGA Tour
Ladies European Tour
LPGA of Japan Tour
LPGA of Korea Tour
ALPG Tour
Majors (two wins)
U.S. Women's Open
Women's PGA Championship
The Women's Open Championship (2001−current)
Chevron Championship (1983−current; formerly known as the Dinah Shore, Kraft Nabisco Championship, and ANA Inspiration)
The Evian Championship (2013−current)
du Maurier Classic (1979−2000)
Titleholders Championship (1937-1966, 1972)
Women's Western Open (1930-1967)

Categories from 1996 to 2013
From 1996 to 2013, members were inducted into the Hall of Fame in one of five categories: PGA Tour/Champions Tour, LPGA Tour, International, Lifetime Achievement, and Veterans.

PGA Tour/Champions Tour ballot
Current and former PGA Tour and Champions Tour players were eligible for this ballot if they met the following requirements (beginning with 1996 election):

PGA Tour
Minimum of 40 years old
PGA Tour member for 10 years
10 PGA Tour wins or two wins in the majors or Players Championship
Champions Tour
Champions Tour member for five years
20 wins between PGA Tour and Champions Tour or five wins in the majors (regular or senior) or Players Championship

Election requirements:

Voters voted for up to 30% of the players on the ballot. If a player was named on less than 5% of the ballots for two consecutive years, they were dropped from the ballot. Players not elected could remain on the ballot indefinitely (prior to 2007 the limit was 10 years, from 2007 to 2009 the limit was 15 years).

LPGA point system
LPGA Tour golfers were eligible through a point system. Since 1999, LPGA members automatically qualified for World Golf Hall of Fame membership when they meet these three criteria:

Must be/have been an "active" LPGA Tour member for 10 years.
Must have won/been awarded at least one of the following - an LPGA major championship, the Vare Trophy or Player of the Year honors; and
Must have accumulated a total of 27 points, which are awarded as follows - one point for each LPGA official tournament win, two points for each LPGA major tournament win and one point for each Vare Trophy or Rolex Player of the Year honor earned.

Before 1999, players had to win 30 tournaments, including two majors; 35 tournaments with one major; or 40 tournaments in all to automatically qualify. At one time, players had to win two different majors to qualify with 30 wins, but this was changed earlier in the 1990s.

This point system is still used for selection to the LPGA Hall of Fame. However, in March 2022, the ten-year requirement was scrapped, and a point for winning an Olympic gold medal was added to the criteria.

International ballot
Men and women golfers not fully eligible for PGA/Champions Tour ballot or the LPGA Tour point system were eligible for the International ballot if they met the following requirements (beginning with the 1996 election):

Minimum of 40 years old
Cumulative 50 points earned as follows:
Men
6 points – Major victories
4 points – Players Championship win
3 points – Other PGA Tour win, European Tour win
2 points – Japan Golf Tour, Sunshine Tour, PGA Tour of Australasia, Champions Tour win
1 point – Other national championship win; Ryder Cup, Presidents Cup participation
Women
6 points – Major victories
4 points – Other LPGA Tour win, Women's British Open win prior to 2001
2 points – LPGA of Japan Tour win, Ladies European Tour win
1 point – Other national championship win, Solheim Cup participation

Election requirements: same as PGA Tour ballot.

Lifetime Achievement category
There was also a "lifetime achievement" category through which anyone who had made a major contribution to the organization or promotion of the sport may be selected, for example, Bob Hope. These members were chosen by the Hall of Fame's Board of Directors. Most played golf, in some cases with some competitive success, but it was not their play alone which won them a place in the Hall of Fame.

Veteran's category
The last category was created to honor professional or amateur players whose career concluded at least 30 years ago. These members were also chosen by the Hall of Fame's Board of Directors.

Membership
New members are inducted each year on the Monday before The Players Championship (previous to 2010 in October or November), and by May 2013 there were 146 members. Beginning in 2010, the ballots are due in July with the results announced later in the year. New entrants in the Lifetime Achievement and Veteran's categories are announced at irregular intervals. For example, Frank Chirkinian was elected in the Lifetime Achievement category in an emergency election in February 2011, with the vote presumably held because he was then terminally ill with lung cancer; when it became clear he would not live to attend his induction, he videotaped his acceptance speech in late February, less than two weeks before his death.

Men 
Unless stated otherwise these men were inducted mainly for their on-course success. The exceptions mostly correspond with the lifetime achievement category, but not quite. For example, Charlie Sifford was notable as a player but was inducted for lifetime achievement.
1974  Walter Hagen
1974  Ben Hogan
1974  Bobby Jones
1974  Byron Nelson
1974  Jack Nicklaus
1974  Francis Ouimet
1974  Arnold Palmer
1974  Gary Player
1974  Gene Sarazen
1974  Sam Snead
1974  Harry Vardon
1975  Willie Anderson
1975  Fred Corcoran – many-faceted promoter and administrator
1975  Joseph Dey – executive director of the USGA and the first commissioner of the PGA Tour
1975  Chick Evans
1975  Young Tom Morris
1975  John Henry Taylor
1976   Tommy Armour
1976  James Braid
1976  Old Tom Morris
1976  Jerome Travers
1977  Bobby Locke
1977  John Ball
1977  Herb Graffis – golf writer and founder of the U.S. National Golf Foundation
1977  Donald Ross – golf course architect
1978  Billy Casper
1978  Harold Hilton
1978  Bing Crosby – celebrity friend of golf who founded his own PGA Tour event
1978  Clifford Roberts – co-founder of the Augusta National Golf Club and the Masters Tournament
1979  Walter Travis
1980  Henry Cotton
1980  Lawson Little
1981  Ralph Guldahl
1981  Lee Trevino
1982  Julius Boros
1983  Jimmy Demaret
1983  Bob Hope – celebrity friend of golf who founded his own PGA Tour event
1986  Cary Middlecoff
1987  Robert Trent Jones – golf course architect
1988  Bob Harlow – promoter who played a key role in the early development of the PGA Tour
1988  Peter Thomson
1988  Tom Watson
1989  Jim Barnes
1989  Roberto De Vicenzo
1989  Raymond Floyd
1990  William C. Campbell – two-time President of the USGA
1990  Gene Littler
1990  Paul Runyan
1990  Horton Smith
1992  Harry Cooper
1992  Hale Irwin
1992  Chi-Chi Rodríguez
1992  Richard Tufts – ran Pinehurst and served as President of the USGA
1996  Johnny Miller
1997  Seve Ballesteros
1997  Nick Faldo
1998  Lloyd Mangrum
2000  Jack Burke Jr.
2000  Deane Beman – Commissioner of the PGA Tour 1974-1994
2000  Michael Bonallack – British golf administrator
2000  Neil Coles – first Chairman of the PGA European Tour
2000  John Jacobs – first Tournament Director of the European Tour
2001  Bernhard Langer (inducted with 2002 class)
2001  Greg Norman
2001  Payne Stewart
2001  Allan Robertson
2001  Karsten Solheim – golf equipment manufacturer and founder of the Solheim Cup
2002  Ben Crenshaw
2002  Tony Jacklin
2002  Tommy Bolt
2002  Harvey Penick – golf instructor
2003  Nick Price
2003  Leo Diegel
2004  Charlie Sifford
2004  Isao Aoki
2004  Tom Kite
2005  Bernard Darwin – golf writer
2005  Alister MacKenzie – golf course architect
2005  Willie Park Sr.
2005  Vijay Singh (inducted with 2006 class)
2006  Larry Nelson
2006  Henry Picard
2006  Mark McCormack – sports agent who represented many top golfers; the developer of golf's first world ranking system, adapted into today's Official World Golf Ranking
2007  Joe Carr
2007  Hubert Green
2007  Charles B. Macdonald – inaugural U.S. Amateur champion, founding Vice-President of the USGA and "Father of American Golf Architecture"
2007  Kel Nagle
2007  Curtis Strange
2008  Bob Charles
2008  Pete Dye – golf course architect
2008  Denny Shute
2008  Herbert Warren Wind – golf writer
2008  Craig Wood
2009  Christy O'Connor Snr
2009  José María Olazábal
2009  Lanny Wadkins
2009  Dwight D. Eisenhower – former U.S. President
2011  Ernie Els
2011  Masashi "Jumbo" Ozaki
2011  Doug Ford
2011   Jock Hutchison
2011  Frank Chirkinian – television producer, known as the 'father of televised golf' for the impact he had on golf broadcasting.
2011  George H. W. Bush – former U.S. President
2012  Phil Mickelson
2012  Dan Jenkins – golf writer
2012  Sandy Lyle
2012  Peter Alliss
2013  Fred Couples
2013  Ken Venturi
2013  Willie Park Jr.
2013  Colin Montgomerie
2013  Ken Schofield – Executive Director of the European Tour
2015  David Graham
2015  Mark O'Meara
2015  A. W. Tillinghast – golf course architect
2017  Henry Longhurst – golf writer and commentator 
2017  Davis Love III
2017  Ian Woosnam
2019  Retief Goosen
2019  Billy Payne − Chairman of Augusta National Golf Club
2019  Dennis Walters − disabled golfer and inspirational speaker and performer
2021  Tiger Woods
2021  Tim Finchem – Commissioner of the PGA Tour 1994–2017
2023  Johnny Farrell
2023  Pádraig Harrington
2023  Tom Weiskopf

Women 
The first five women on this list were grandfathered in 1998 from the Hall of Fame of Women's Golf, which was founded in 1951, via the LPGA Tour Hall of Fame, which was inaugurated in 1967. The list shows the years when they were originally inducted into the Hall of Fame of Women's Golf. Unless stated otherwise the women on the list were inducted primarily for their on-course achievements.  Players marked with an (f) denotes they were elected twice -- once individually, and once collectively for the 2024 nominations announced on March 8, 2023 for the 13 LPGA founders.
1951  Betty Jameson (f)
1951  Patty Berg (f)
1951  Louise Suggs (f)
1951  Babe Didrikson Zaharias (f)
1960  Betsy Rawls
1964  Mickey Wright
1975  Glenna Collett-Vare
1975  Joyce Wethered
1975  Kathy Whitworth
1977  Sandra Haynie
1977  Carol Mann
1978   Dorothy Campbell Hurd Howe
1982  JoAnne Carner
1987  Nancy Lopez
1991  Pat Bradley
1993  Patty Sheehan
1994  Dinah Shore – celebrity friend of the LPGA; founded a tournament that eventually became a major
1995  Betsy King
1999  Amy Alcott
2000  Beth Daniel
2000  Juli Inkster
2000  Judy Rankin
2001  Donna Caponi
2001  Judy Bell – administrator; first female President of the USGA
2002  Marlene Bauer Hagge (f)
2003  Hisako "Chako" Higuchi
2003  Annika Sörenstam
2004  Marlene Stewart Streit
2005  Ayako Okamoto
2005  Karrie Webb
2006  Marilynn Smith (f)
2007  Pak Se-ri
2008  Carol Semple Thompson
2012  Hollis Stacy
2015  Laura Davies
2017  Meg Mallon
2017  Lorena Ochoa
2019  Peggy Kirk Bell
2019  Jan Stephenson
2021  Marion Hollins
2021  Susie Maxwell Berning
2023  Beverly Hanson
2023  Sandra Palmer
2023 LPGA Founders (those not previously in Hall listed):
  Alice Bauer
  Bettye Danoff
  Helen Dettweiler
  Helen Hicks
  Opal Hill
  Sally Sessions
  Shirley Spork

Notes

References

External links

St. Johns County, Florida
Golf museums and halls of fame
Golf in the United States
Golf in Florida
Golf
Sports museums in Florida
Museums in St. Johns County, Florida
International Sports Heritage Association
Awards established in 1974
1974 establishments in North Carolina